Peronomerus is a genus of beetles in the family Carabidae, containing the following species:

 Peronomerus auripilis Bates, 1883
 Peronomerus fumatus Schaum, 1854
 Peronomerus hornabrooki Darlington, 1971 
 Peronomerus nigrinus Bates, 1873
 Peronomerus sagitticollis Louwerens, 1954 
 Peronomerus xanthopus Andrewes, 1936

References

Panagaeinae